The median arcuate ligament is a ligament under the diaphragm that connects the right and left crura of diaphragm.

Structure 
The median arcuate ligament is formed by the right and left crura of the diaphragm. The crura connect to form an arch, behind which is the aortic hiatus, through which pass the aorta, the azygos vein, and the thoracic duct.

Variation 
In between 10% and 24% of people, the median arcuate ligament occurs very low.

Clinical significance
Compression of celiac artery and celiac ganglia by the median arcuate ligament can lead to the median arcuate ligament syndrome, which is characterized by abdominal pain, weight loss, and an epigastric bruit.

See also 
 Medial arcuate ligament
 Lateral arcuate ligament

References

External links 
  - "The abdominal surface of the diaphragm."
 

Ligaments of the torso
Thoracic diaphragm